Richard Henn Collins, Baron Collins  (31 January 1842 – 3 January 1911) was an Anglo-Irish lawyer and judge.

Life
Born in Dublin, Collins was educated at the Royal School Dungannon and Trinity College Dublin (where he was elected a Scholar), and Downing College, Cambridge.

In 1867, he was called to the English bar and joined the northern circuit. He was made a Queen's Counsel in 1883 and a judge in 1891.

Having made a Lord Justice of Appeal in 1897, he was appointed also to the Privy Council. In October 1901, Collins became Master of the Rolls after the death of Sir Archibald Smith, and the following month was appointed to the accompanying post of Chairman of the Historical Manuscripts Commission. He received the honorary degree LL.D. from the University of Cambridge in May 1902. On 6 March 1907 he was appointed a Lord of Appeal in Ordinary, receiving additionally a life peerage with the title Baron Collins, of Kensington in the County of London. He resigned as Lord of Appeal on 9 January 1910.

Lord Collins was judge of the trial of Oscar Wilde's libel prosecution against the Marquess of Queensberry on 3 April 1895 (as noted in "The Trials of Oscar Wilde", by H. Montgomery Hyde (1962) at p97). He represented Great Britain on the Venezuela Boundary Commission, established to adjudicate in the boundary dispute between British Guiana and Venezuela in 1899. In 1904, he was chairman of the commission which investigated the case of Adolf Beck.

He died at Hove, East Sussex on 3 January 1911.

Family
His wife, Jane Ogle, Lady Collins (d. 1934), is buried in Brompton Cemetery. His younger son, Sir Stephen Henn-Collins, became a High Court judge.

Cases
Sumpter v Hedges
Wilde v Douglas
Chandler v Webster
Henderson v Arthur

References

External links

1842 births
1911 deaths
Alumni of Downing College, Cambridge
Alumni of Trinity College Dublin
Burials at Brompton Cemetery
Knights Bachelor
Law lords
Masters of the Rolls
Members of the Judicial Committee of the Privy Council
Members of the Privy Council of the United Kingdom
Queen's Bench Division judges
19th-century King's Counsel
Scholars of Trinity College Dublin
19th-century English judges
20th-century English judges
Lords Justices of Appeal
Peers created by Edward VII
Presidents of the Classical Association